IVT may refer to:

In computing
 Interrupt vector table, a memory construct in some processors
 Intel Virtualization Technology, a computer processor feature to simplify virtualization

Other
 Intermediate value theorem, an analysis theorem
 Initial value theorem, a mathematical theorem using Laplace transform
 Integrated water vapor transport, a meteorological term used in describing atmospheric rivers.
 Current, Voltage, Temperature
 Infinitely Variable Transmission, a type of continuously variable transmission system for motor vehicles and other applications
 Illini Variable Temperature diluent
 In Vitro transcription/translation, a molecular biology technique to produce RNA in a tube